is a Japanese josei manga written and illustrated by Arina Tanemura. Idol Dreams is serialized in the bimonthly manga magazine Melody since 2013.

Plot

Chikage Deguchi, a 31-year-old office worker, believes her life to be dull and full of missed opportunities. She is nostalgic for when she was 15 years old, which she believes to be at her prime. During her middle school reunion, Chikage becomes humiliated when her class discovers that she has never had a boyfriend, and when she plans on confessing to her former classmate, Haruki Kunitachi, she becomes crushed when she learns he has a girlfriend.

When Kanshi Tokita, another former classmate, finds her, he offers her an experimental drug that can change her body to her 15-year-old self for 5–6 hours. After Chikage takes it, she is suddenly scouted to become an idol, and she decides to take the chance to make the most of what she missed out when she was younger. Going under the name Akari Deguchi as her 15-year-old self, Chikage begins to lead a double life.

Characters

Chikage is a 31-year-old office worker who is unconfident with herself and embarrassed for never having a boyfriend. With an experimental drug, she can change into her 15-year-old self for 5-6 hours and names her alter-ego . As Akari, she becomes an idol.

Tokita is Chikage's classmate from middle school and a pharmacist who introduced her to a drug that can change her into her 15-year-old self. He has been in love with Chikage ever since she helped him when he was bullied and struggles to balance his feelings for her and his fiance, Hinagiku.

Hibiki is a 15-year-old idol and the face of the boy band Valentine, who Chikage feels bears a resemblance to Haru. He is a musical prodigy and his insistence at perfection puts him at odds with his bandmates, but Hibiki plans on eventually becoming a music producer after his idol activities end. He is the older brother of Kanade from Neko to Watashi no Kinyōbi.

Nicknamed  for his mushroom-like hairstyle, Ru is a member of Valentine who initially disagrees with Hibiki and threatens to quit the group, but Akari persuades him to stay. Akari later agrees to date him later in the story.

Yuko is an upcoming idol whose music was produced by Hibiki, but she ran away before her debut showcase, leaving Akari to take her spot.

Nicknamed , he was one of the class representatives along with Chikage in middle school, and Chikage has been in love with him since.

Hinagiku is Chikage's co-worker and later revealed to be Tokita's fiance.

Media

Manga

Originally titled Thirty-one I Dream in Japan, the series is written and illustrated by Arina Tanemura. It is serialized in the bimonthly magazine Melody since April 27, 2013. The chapters were later released in 7 bound volumes by Hakusensha under the Hana to Yume Comics Melody imprint. While writing the series, Tanemura announced that several characters from Neko to Watashi no Kinyōbi, which ran concurrently in Margaret, would be making minor appearances.

The limited edition of volume 3 was bundled with a character song CD for Tokita, featuring the song  with lyrics written by Tanemura. Tokita was voiced by Ryohei Kimura, who had provided the voice for Eichi Sakurai in the anime adaptation of Full Moon o Sagashite, one of Tanemura's previous works.

In 2015, Viz Media licensed the series for North American distribution in English, under the title Idol Dreams and with the Shojo Beat imprint. Volume 4 was originally slated to be released on November 7, 2017, but was delayed to due to a fire in the warehouse storing the books.

Reception

Anime News Network named Idol Dreams as the "best reworking [manga] of an old genre" in 2015, comparing it to age-shifting idols like Fancy Lala and Creamy Mami. Rebecca Silverman from Anime News Network praised the first volume, comparing it to the similar themes from Tanemura's previous work Full Moon o Sagashite, and stated it appealed to older fans who grew up with her work. Likewise, Silverman praised the second volume for exploring Tokita's character, and the inclusion of Tanemura's interview with LaLa Melody Online provided more detail on the series' concept.

Volume 1 debuted at #19 on Oricon and sold 49,107 copies in its first week. Volume 3 debuted at #44 on Oricon and sold 19,704 copies in its first week. Volume 4 debuted at #42 on Oricon and sold 15,127 copies in its first week and 31,762 copies overall.

References

External links
 
 

2013 manga
Drama anime and manga
Romance anime and manga
Josei manga
Hakusensha manga
Viz Media manga